Jeff Braun (born August 9, 1989) is a Grammy-nominated, multi-platinum mix engineer. He has mixed records for Jason Aldean, Kane Brown, Nelly, Mitchell Tenpenny, Cole Swindell, Elle King, Chris Young, Hunter Hayes, Granger Smith, LoCash, The Band CAMINO, Ingrid Andress, Sam Tinnesz, Adam Doleac, Seaforth, Lindsay Ell, and more. Braun has mixed sixteen #1 songs and recently earned his first CMA Award nominated for "Single of the Year". He currently resides in Nashville, Tennessee.

Early years and personal life

Braun was born in Minneapolis, Minnesota. He was drawn to music at an early age, picking up the drums at 12 years old. While in school at Lakeville North High School, Braun was the captain of the drumline. He also joined a band where he performed in acts sharing the stage with bands such as Cartel, Gym Class Heroes and Quietdrive; as well as playing on the Vans Warped Tour. At age 18, Braun started recording and mixing local bands.

After high school, Braun attended Middle Tennessee State University where he graduated with a Bachelor of Science in Audio Production.  His studio was involved in the AES recording competition in the "Traditional Studio" category. He also represented MTSU in Shure's 8th annual Fantastic Scholastic recording competition in which he won for the university over $11,000 in microphones.

After graduation, he co-founded Forty-One Fifteen, a multi room studio facility located in East Nashville, Tennessee. After a few years of tracking he transitioned into mixing full time. Braun currently works out of his private mix room, "Anthem House".

In May 2018, Braun celebrated his first #1 song with Jason Aldean's song "You Make It Easy". He was also nominated for his first CMA Award for "Single of the Year", with Aldean's song "Drowns the Whiskey (featuring Miranda Lambert)". Shortly after, he was able to achieve another #1 with Mitchell Tenpenny's song "Drunk Me".  Most recently he has celebrated two more #1's with Aldean for his songs "Drowns the Whiskey (featuring Miranda Lambert)" and "Girl Like You".  Braun has also mixed releases for artists such as Granger Smith, Kane Brown, Hunter Hayes, LOCASH, Dylan Schneider, The Band CAMINO, and many more.

Braun's mixes have also been used in movies and trailers such as The Emoji Movie, Pitch Perfect 3, The Walking Dead, Pretty Little Liars, Parenthood, Nashville, Shameless, and more.

Mixing discography

RIAA Certifications

Related Awards

References

External links
 
 Partial Discography on All Music

Living people
1989 births
People from Minneapolis
People from Nashville, Tennessee